The South Lake Michigan Conference was an IHSAA-sanctioned conference situated in LaPorte and Starke counties. Started in 1907 as the LaPorte County Conference, the county had only five non-city schools left by 1965. The league then decided to rebrand itself as the SLMC and add Michigan City Marquette and Oregon-Davis. However, continuing consolidation would leave the league unstable, and the conference was back down to five schools by 1969. The end came when two of those schools joined the Porter County Conference, leaving the three remaining schools to become independents.

The league can be considered a predecessor to the Northland Conference, which was started 23 years later by four of the five SLMC members at the time of its disbanding. That conference was also plagued by a lack of stability, and folded in 2010.

Members

 Played concurrently in LCC and Kankakee Valley Conference 1943–49.
 Played concurrently in SLMC and TVAC 1965–67.

References

Resources
E.T. Pearl's Basketball Corner

Indiana high school athletic conferences
High school sports conferences and leagues in the United States
Indiana High School Athletic Association disestablished conferences